Ibri or Ibris may refer to:
 Ibri, a city in Oman
 Ibar, a river in Kosovo, Montenegro and Serbia, known as Ibri among Albanians
 Ibrict, a college located in Ibri, Oman
 Eyebroughy, also known as Ibris, an islet in Scotland
 IBRI, or Indiana Biosciences Research Institute